Schlechtendalia chinensis, the Chinese sumac aphid, is an aphid species, and the only species in the genus Schlechtendalia.

The species produce galls on the Chinese sumac (Rhus chinensis). The gall is called Chinese gall, Galla Chinensis or wu bei zi (五倍子) in Chinese. It is rich in gallotannins, a type of hydrolysable tannins. The infestation by Chinese sumac aphids  can lead to a gall which is valued as a commercial product. Chinese galls are used in Chinese medicine to treat coughs, diarrhea, night sweats, dysentery and to stop intestinal and uterine bleeding.

References

External links

Hemiptera of Asia
Insects described in 1851
Eriosomatinae